The Doga language is an Austronesian language spoken by about 200 people along Cape Vogel in the Milne Bay Province of Papua New Guinea.

Vocabulary

 'pig'

 'blood'

 'woman'

 'long yam'

 'four'

 'how many'

 'smoke'

 'who?'

 'we (incl.)'

 'they'

 'leg'

 'mosquito'

 'one'

References

Further reading 
Landweer, M. Lynn. "Sociolinguistic Survey Report of the Anuki Language, Cape Vogel, Milne Bay Province, Papua New Guinea." 2001
Landweer, Martha Lynn. 2006. A Melanesian perspective on mechanisms of language maintenance and shift: case studies from Papua New Guinea. Ph.D., University of Essex. 2 vols.

External links 
 Open-access materials on Doga are available through Paradisec, including the Arthur Capell collection (AC2) and the Tom Dutton collection (TD1)

Definitely endangered languages
Nuclear Papuan Tip languages
Languages of Milne Bay Province